Kranefuss (or Kranefuß) is a German surname, and may refer to:

 Fritz Kranefuss (1900-1945), German industrialist
 Lee Kranefuss (born 1961), American businessman
 Michael Kranefuss (born 1938), German-American former head of Ford Motor Company's International motorsports division

German-language surnames